The Jamesburg Earth Station is located in the rural Cachagua area of Carmel Valley, California, about  southeast of Monterey. It was originally built in 1968 to support the Apollo 11 moon landing.

The 10-story high,  dish, driven by a Vertex-RSI 7210 drive system, served for about 35 years as the West Coast Teleport of AT&T/COMSAT's communications Satellite Network, and was the earth station serving Intelsat satellites parked in geosynchronous orbit over the Pacific Ocean. The dish played a role in capturing and distributing images of the Apollo 11 moon landing and the Tiananmen Square protests of 1989. The dish is housed in a 20,000 square foot building on a  site that has been subdivided for residential building. When fiber-optic undersea communication cables became economically competitive in 2002, AT&T shut down the site and sold the entire station with its facilities intact. For a time, it was operated by 11 ham radio operators who spent five months restoring the facility. They were eventually able to bounce 20 radio signals off the moon.

In 2005, a new owner, intending to use the structure as a weekend home, stripped the interior and sold the contents as scrap, although the dish itself remains. The new owner decided to sell the property after his youngest son died of cancer. In January 2012, it was put up for sale for $2,950,000.

In 2013, the Jamesburg Earth Station was leased by Lone Signal, an active SETI program, to send messages from the Earth to Gliese 526, a red dwarf star on the Catalog of Nearby Habitable Systems.

Gallery

See also
 Andover Earth Station
 Carnarvon Tracking Station
 Roaring Creek Station
 Ground station
 Honeysuckle Creek Tracking Station
 Kaena Point Space Force Station
 Sugar Grove Station
 Goonhilly Satellite Earth Station

References

Further reading 
 

 Jamesburg dish, archived 7/9/2019
 Atlantic article on the Jamesburg station, accessed 2/12/2012
 Jamesburg earth station photos
 List of Approved Non-Routine Earth Station Antennas

1968 establishments in California
Earth stations in the United States
Buildings and structures in California
Carmel Valley, California